Sochi,  is a city in Krasnodar Krai, Russia, located on the eastern Black Sea coastline. Sochi has a humid subtropical climate (Köppen climate classification Cfa), with cool to mild winters and warm summers. Sochi is humid throughout the entire year, most especially during winters, which are very damp. Summers are also humid but sunny as well, although no month has less than 10 rainy days. Sochi is very warm for Russian standards. 

The territory of Sochi contains many microclimates, the daytime temperatures can vary as much as 10 °C between coastal areas in Adler and Lazarevsky compared with Krasnaya Polyana.

Temperature 

Large fluctuations in temperature are rare.

Seasonal climate

Winter 
Winters in Sochi are cool to mild. Snow and frosts are not uncommon from December to March.

Summer 
Generally the summer season lasts about six months, from May to October.

Climate data tables

Climate of micro-districts of Sochi

Black Sea temperatures

See also
Climate of Russia
Climate of Moscow

References

External links
Weather Report for Sochi, Russia

Sochi
Sochi
Climate of Russia